Calosoma prominens is a species of ground beetle in the subfamily Carabinae. It was described by John Lawrence LeConte in 1853.

References

prominens
Beetles described in 1853